Caswell County Schools is a PK–12 graded school district serving Caswell County, North Carolina. Its six schools serve 3,012 students as of the 2010–2011 school year.

Student demographics
For the 2010–2011 school year, Caswell County Schools had a total population of 3,012 students and 215.06 teachers on a (FTE) basis. This produced a student-teacher ratio of 14.01:1. That same year, out of the student total, the gender ratio was 53% male to 47% female. The demographic group makeup was: White, 53%; Black, 36%; Hispanic, 7%; American Indian, 0%; and Asian/Pacific Islander, 0% (two or more races: 4%). For the same school year, 66.98% of the students received free and reduced-cost lunches.

Governance
The primary governing body of Caswell County Schools follows a council–manager government format with a seven-member Board of Education appointing a superintendent to run the day-to-day operations of the system. The school system is part of the North Carolina State Board of Education's Fifth District.

Board of Education
The seven members of the Board of Education generally meet on the second and fourth Mondays of each month. The members are elected by the district to staggered four-year terms. As of April 2022, the members of the board are: 

Wayne Owen (Chair), District 2
Gladys Garland (Vice-Chair), District 3
Mel Battle, At-large
Donna Hudson, District 5
Trudy Blackwell, District 4
Tracy Stanley, At-large
Vennie Beggarly, District 1

Superintendent
Its superintendents have included Douglas Barker, who retired on June 30, 2013. He became superintendent in 2001 replacing the retiring Skip Rowland. Barker had been a principal and an assistant superintendent in the Henderson County Public Schools.

Integration history

Member schools
Caswell County Schools has six schools ranging from pre-kindergarten to twelfth grade. The six schools are one high school, one middle school, and four elementary schools.

High school
 Bartlett Yancey High School (in Yanceyville)

Middle schools
 N.L. Dillard Middle School (in Yanceyville)

Elementary schools
 North Elementary School (in Providence)
 Oakwood Elementary School (in Yanceyville)
 South Elementary School (in Mebane)
 Stoney Creek Elementary School (in Reidsville)

See also
List of school districts in North Carolina

References

Works cited

External links
 

Education in Caswell County, North Carolina
School districts in North Carolina